Angelina Ballerina is a British animated preschool children's television series, based on the Angelina Ballerina series of children's books by author Katharine Holabird and illustrator Helen Craig. The series is about Angelina Mouseling, a young mouse who loves to dance ballet, and her family and classmates. Finty Williams performed the voice of Angelina, and her real-life mother Judi Dench performed the voice of Miss Lilly, her old ballet teacher.

The show had 39 15-minute-long episodes, as well as three longer specials, which first aired from 2001 to 2006. The series was produced by HIT Entertainment and Grand Slamm Children's Films. It aired on PBS Kids and PBS Kids Sprout in the United States, where it was presented by Connecticut Public Television, and on the CITV in the United Kingdom.

SD Entertainment and HIT Entertainment produced a CGI revival, Angelina Ballerina: The Next Steps, which aired on Milkshake! from 2009 to 2010.

Episodes

Characters
 Angelina Mouseling (voiced by Finty Williams) is a helpful, feisty, quiet, and soft-voiced little white dancing mouse who loves to dance and always dreams of becoming a famous prima ballerina. Angelina has the tendency to come off as rather hot-headed, but she ultimately means well. She often wears a pink leotard top, tutu, vest, hair ribbon, and ballet slippers.
 Miss Lilly (voiced by Judi Dench) is Angelina's ballet teacher. Miss Lily is a kind and motherly figure to the mouselings that attend her class. Although she has good intentions, can come across as quite negative at times as she scolds her class if they make mistakes. She also isn't that good at telling the twins off if they bully and can turn a blind eye. She seems like she favours them. She grew up in Dacovia, which is a faraway land from Mouseland. She speaks English with a Russian accent. 
 Alice Nimbletoes (voiced by Jo Wyatt) is Angelina's soft-voiced best friend, who is very skilled at gymnastics. She is brown and often wears a green leotard top, tutu, vest,  hair ribbon, and ballet slippers. She has a very big appetite and also appears slightly lighter in colour in Angelina Ballerina: The Next Steps. She speaks with an Irish accent.
 William Longtail (voiced by Keith Wickham) is one of two boys in Miss Lilly's ballet class. In one of the episodes, it's shown that he has a crush on Angelina.
 Mr. Longtail (voiced by Keith Wickham) is William's father who works as a Station Porter and praises his son for any efforts he tries to make, especially if it is his first time.
 Priscilla (voiced by Jo Wyatt) and Penelope Pinkpaws (voiced by Jonell Elliott) are twin sisters who tease and belittle nearly everyone, including each other. They are particularly jealous of Angelina for her dancing talent. Priscilla wears lilac leotard tops, tutu, lilac ballet slippers, and wears a purple hair ribbon. Penelope wears a purple leotard top, tutu, purple ballet slippers, and wears a lilac hair ribbon. They also have a baby brother in the episodes Angelina's Surprise and The Ballet Tickets.
 Sammy Watts (voiced by Jo Wyatt) is one of Angelina's classmates in school. Sammy is a bully who often causes trouble for William and Angelina particularly but has a heart of gold. He can often be seen wearing a yellow hat with a red dot in the middle.
 Mr. Watts is Sammy's dad who only appeared in a few episodes. His first name is never used.
 Mr. Maurice Mouseling (voiced by Keith Wickham) is Angelina and Polly's father and the proprietor of the Mouseland Gazette. 
 Mrs. Matilda Mouseling (voiced by Jonell Elliott) is Angelina and Polly's mother. Her maiden surname is Fielding. She has a sister Amanda, who has a son.
 Polly Mouseling is the youngest daughter of Maurice and Matilda and the little sister of Angelina. Polly is an infant with brown fur and often wears a pink dress. In the TV series Angelina Ballerina: The Next Steps, Polly is four years old with white fur instead of brown and she wears a blue jumper with a yellow T-shirt.
 Grandma Sophia Mouseling and Grandpa Jeffrey Mouseling (voiced by Adrienne Posta and Keith Wickham) are Angelina, Polly, and Henry's paternal grandparents, Maurice and Louis' parents and Matilda and Lavender's parents-in-law. They are sometimes mentioned in Angelina Ballerina: The Next Steps.
 Uncle Louis Mouseling (voiced by Rob Rackstraw) is Lavender's husband, Maurice's brother, Angelina and Polly's paternal uncle, Matilda's brother-in-law and Henry's father.
 Aunt Lavender Mouseling (voiced by Finty Williams) is Louis's wife, Angelina and Polly's paternal aunt, Maurice's sister-in-law, Matilda's sister-in-law and Henry's mother.
 Henry Mouseling (voiced by Jo Wyatt) is Angelina and Polly's soft-voiced paternal cousin, Lavender and Louis's son, Grandma and Grandpa's grandson, and Matilda and Maurice's nephew.
 Mrs. Hodgepodge (voiced by Finty Williams) is Angelina and Polly's next-door neighbor who does not like dancing. She always appears grumpy and is viewed with fear by most of the Chipping Cheddar mouselings, but occasionally helps the mouselings often when they least expect it.
 Dr. Tuttle (voiced by Keith Wickham) is the doctor in the town of Chipping Cheddar.
 Miss Quaver (voiced by Finty Williams) is Miss Lilly's nervous pianist, who plays the piano during dance classes.
 Mr. Ivor Operatski (voiced by Derek Jacobi) is an old friend of Miss Lilly's and a stern choreographer. Angelina is convinced (wrongly, as it turns out) that he hates mouselings.
 Queen Seraphina (voiced by Adrienne Posta) is King George's wife and a childhood friend of Miss Lilly's and the present Queen of Mouseland. She speaks Victorian with a Victorian accent. 
 King George (voiced by Keith Wickham) is Queen Seraphina's husband and the King of Mouseland. He speaks English with an English accent. 
 Princess Valentine (voiced by Adrienne Posta) is Queen Seraphina's middle daughter.
 Anya Mousezauski (voiced by Adrienne Posta) is a shy mouse who comes to Chipping Cheddar as part of a migrant family from Dacovia working through the harvest season. She has an ear with a black patch that Sammy and the Pinkpaws twins make fun of. She befriends Angelina and Alice and later joins Miss Lilly's ballet class when she returns to Chipping Cheddar for a visit.
 Mrs. Pinkpaws (voiced by Jonell Elliott) is the mother of the twins Priscilla and Penelope and their baby brother. She appears in a couple of the episodes. She speaks with a Southern accent and wears a lot of jewelry. 
 Ms. Chalk (voiced by Jonell Elliott) is a teacher in Angelina's class at school and can be both strict and fair to her pupils.
 Mrs. Thimble (voiced by Finty Williams) is the elderly kind-hearted store owner.
 Mr. Ratchett (voiced by Keith Wickham) is a builder and crane driver.
 Miss Twitchett (voiced by Finty Williams) is a gentle old lady who loves wrapping things up.

Release

Hit Entertainment UK/US DVD and VHS releases 
 Angelina Ballerina: The Gift and Other Stories (2001, UK/2003, US) (The Gift, Angelina in the Wings, Arthur the Butterfly, The Costume Ball, Miss Lilly is Leaving) 
 Meet Angelina Ballerina (2004) (The Ballet Tickets, Two Mice in a Boat) 
 Angelina Ballerina: Rose Fairy Princess (2002, UK/2004, US) (The Rose Fairy Princess, Two Mice in a Boat, Angelina at the Fair, The Ballet Tickets) 
 Angelina Ballerina: Angelina's Baby Sister (2002, UK/2004, US) (Promotional VHS) 	
 Angelina Ballerina: Friends Forever (2002, UK/2004, US) (Ballerina Rag Doll, Angelina's Surprise, Treasure Tandems, Alice's Present)
 Angelina Ballerina: The Lucky Penny (2003) 
 Angelina Ballerina: The Magic of Dance (William the Conjurer, Angelina and Grandma, Miss Lilly Comes to Dinner, Angelina's Valentine) 
 Angelina Ballerina: The Dance Of Friendship (2005) (Angelina and Anya, Alice's Present) 
 Angelina Ballerina: Lights, Camera, Action! (2005) 
 Angelina Ballerina: All Dancers on Deck / Angelina Ballerina: Angelina Sets Sail (2006)
 Angelina Ballerina: Angelina And The Sleeping Beauties / Angelina Ballerina: Princess Dance (2006)	
 Angelina Ballerina: The Big Performance (2006) (The Royal Banquet, Angelina the Mouse Detective, Angelina's Baby Sister, The Costume Ball)	
 Angelina Ballerina: Angelina Follows Her Dreams (2007)

Reception
At Indie Awards in 2004, the first episode in season 2 "The Proposal" was named the winner of Best Animation category.

Other media

Merchandise

Plush doll sets by American Girl were released and produced around the early 2000's in tandem with books by author Katharine Holabird and illustrator Helen Craig.

Revivals
SD Entertainment and HIT Entertainment produced a new CGI series called Angelina Ballerina: The Next Steps which ran from September 5, 2009, to November 13, 2010. The series is about Angelina going to a performing arts school. The series was criticized by fans of the original for the redesigns or removals of several characters and the change in setting and format, among other things.

In October 2015, during the MIPCOM, Mattel and 9 Story Media Group announced a long-term business alliance for a second revival of Angelina Ballerina, intended to air in 2017 alongside a revival of fellow HIT Entertainment program Barney & Friends. However, neither came to fruition.

References

External links

  
 
 Angelina Ballerina at the Big Cartoon Database

2000s British children's television series
2000s British animated television series
2000s British drama television series
2001 British television series debuts
2006 British television series endings
2000s preschool education television series
Animated preschool education television series
British children's animated television shows
British preschool education television series
British television shows based on children's books
British television series with live action and animation
English-language television shows
PBS Kids shows
PBS original programming
Elementary school television series
Animated television series about children
Animated television series about mice and rats
Television series about ballet
Television series by Mattel Creations
Television series by 9 Story Media Group
HIT Entertainment
Dance animation